Holcocera bucinae is a moth in the family Blastobasidae which is endemic to Costa Rica.

References

Moths described in 2002
Endemic fauna of Costa Rica
bucinae